"Snip" is the third episode of the fourth season of the American sitcom Modern Family, and the series' 75th episode overall. It aired October 10, 2012. The episode was written by Danny Zuker and directed by Gail Mancuso.

Plot
Alex (Ariel Winter) tries to change her style and the way she dresses to fit with the cool kids at school while Haley (Sarah Hyland) asks Claire (Julie Bowen) to send her the rest of her clothes with the mail. A kid at Luke's (Nolan Gould) school is always opening his locker, but Luke is going to be prepared the next time he will attempt to do it. When Claire comes to school to drop Luke's science project, she is the one who opens the locker.

Gloria (Sofia Vergara) and Jay (Ed O'Neill) visit the doctor for a check up on Gloria's pregnancy. Everything with the pregnancy is fine but Gloria has difficulties coming to terms with the new weight she is gaining. After a day out with Manny (Rico Rodriguez), she finally accepts the fact that she is gaining weight and goes for shopping to buy some maternity clothes.

Since the moment Phil (Ty Burrell) and Claire heard about Gloria's pregnancy they were thinking about Phil having a vasectomy to avoid any possible "accidents" in the future. With everything going on, Claire will not be able to make it in time and go with Phil to his doctor's appointment. He ends up going with Jay, something that makes Phil nervous. When Phil runs away from the clinic, Jay calms him down and takes him back. Claire, after a crazy day, gets there in time having second thoughts herself about Phil's vasectomy. Eventually, they walk away from the clinic with Phil not having the procedure.

Meanwhile, since Lily (Aubrey Anderson-Emmons) now attends kindergarten and Cameron (Eric Stonestreet) has many free time, Mitchell (Jesse Tyler Ferguson) tries to steer him toward getting a part-time job. That is not easy since getting a job was always being a sensitive topic for Cameron. Eventually, Cameron gets the job at Manny's school as the new music teacher.

Reception

Ratings
In its original American broadcast, "Snip" was watched by 12.31 million; up 0.23  from the previous episode, Schooled, that was aired the same night.

Reviews
"Snip" received mixed reviews in contrast to "Schooled", the second episode of the season that was aired at the same night.

Leigh Raines of TV Fanatic rated "Snip" with a 4/5 saying that this was a family-fun night on ABC and as for Claire's relationship with her three kids she stated: "I found everything about Claire's interaction with the kids to be so realistic in this episode."

Donna Bowman of The A.V. Club gave an A− grade to both episodes saying that she can't wait for more. "Two episodes showcasing solid construction, excellent timing, and graceful fillips of feeling. Suddenly, Modern Family seems to be brimming with confidence, looking forward to the possibilities of a rearranged cast of characters. I can’t wait to see more."

Dalene Rovenstine of Paste Magazine rated both episodes with 8.2/10. "It’s too early to say, but this duo of episodes seem to be paving the way for a better season. Although the premiere was lackluster, these episodes provided laughs reminiscent of the first two seasons."

Britt Hayes from Screen Crush stated that this episode was a step up from the previous one.

Michael Adams of 411mania rated the episode with 7/10 saying that "the show had him on the first episode of the night but they lost him on the second one." Adams said that "...it was funny and well written, but not the greatest episode ever."

Pollysgotyournumber of Bitch Stole My Remote said that the episode fell flat after the last one. "A few smaller stories are pursued in this episode, which is fine, but I feel that it lacks the thematic loop-closing that I’ve come to love about this show’s writing."

Zach Dionne from Vulture rated the episode with 3/5 while Shayelizatrotter of The Comedy Critic gave a C+ rate to the episode who also, like Pollysgotyournumber, said that it fell flat.

References

External links 
 
 "Snip" at ABC.com

Modern Family (season 4) episodes
2012 American television episodes